Oley (also called Friedensburg) is a census-designated place (CDP) in northern Oley Township, Berks County, United States, located along Routes 73 and 662. The entire township is listed on the National Register of Historic Places.

The Little Manatawny Creek flows southeastward through Oley into the Manatawny Creek, a tributary of the Schuylkill River. Berks Career and Technology Center has a campus in Oley serving eastern Berks County. Oley Valley High School and Reading Motorcycle Club are also located in Oley. The ZIP code of Oley is 19547. As of the 2010 census the population was 1,282 residents.

Demographics

History
A post office called Oley Furnace was established in 1828, and renamed Oley in 1836. The community took its name from Oley Township.

Notable people
Daniel Boone - American pioneer, frontiersman and folk hero, born near Oley on October 22, 1734.
Tommy Hinnershitz – sprint car racer who was nicknamed the "Oley Dirt Farmer"

References

Census-designated places in Berks County, Pennsylvania
Census-designated places in Pennsylvania